DWCL (92.7 FM), on-air as 92.7 Brigada News FM, is a radio station owned by UBC Media (Love Radio Network) and operated by Brigada Mass Media Corporation. The station's studio and transmitter are located at the UBC Bldg., McArthur Highway, Brgy. Sindalan, San Fernando, Pampanga.

It was formerly known as Power 92.7, airing Christian Music from 1987 to 2015, when BMMC took over the station's operations. It initially served as a relay of its Luzon flagship station, being heard in most parts of Central Luzon. On September 14, 2015, the station launched its own local programming and hook ups from Brigada News FM National despite its proximity.

References

Radio stations in Pampanga
Radio stations established in 1987
2015 establishments in the Philippines